Memory Lane may refer to

Film and television
Memory Lane (2012 film), a 2012 science-fiction film directed by Shawn Holmes
 Memory Lane (1926 film), a 1926 silent film starring Eleanor Boardman
 Brian "Memory" Lane, a character in the BBC television drama series New Tricks, played by Alun Armstrong
 "Memory Lane" (The Vampire Diaries) an episode of the TV series The Vampire Diaries

Music
Memory Lane, a 2010 album by The High Kings
Memory Lane: The Best of McFly, 2012
 "Memory Lane", a 1979 song by Minnie Riperton from the album Minnie
 "Memory Lane", a song by Bugzy Malone
 "Memory Lane", a song by Elliott Smith from the album From a Basement on the Hill
 "Memory Lane", a song by McFly from the album Wonderland
 "Memory Lane", a song by Tim McGraw from the album Tim McGraw
 "Memory Lane (Sittin' in da Park)", a song by Nas from the album Illmatic

Other uses
 Memory Lane (Denton, Maryland), a house on the U.S. National Register of Historic Places
 Memory Lane (audio drama), a Doctor Who audio drama
 Memory Lane, Inc, the company that operates classmates.com, a social media website
 Memory Lane Music Group, New York-based music publishing company founded in 1923